Elizaveta Pletneva (born January 21, 2002) is a Russian-born American group rhythmic gymnast who represented the United States at the 2020 Summer Olympics.

Personal life 
Pletneva and her family moved to the United States when she was three years old. She began rhythmic gymnastics when she was five years old.

Career 
Pletneva competed at the 2018 World Championships where the American group finished fourteenth in the all-around. Then at the 2018 Pan American Championships in Lima, she won the silver medal in both the group all-around and the 3 balls + 2 ropes event final, both behind Mexico.

Pletneva competed at the 2019 Pan American Games and won the silver medal in the group all-around and in the 5 balls event final, both times finishing behind Mexico. Then at the 2019 World Championships in Baku, the American group finished tenth.

At the 2021 Pan American Championships in Rio de Janeiro, Pletneva and the American group won the bronze medals in the all-around, and in both the 5 balls and the 3 hoops + 4 clubs event finals. The United States qualified for the 2020 Olympic Games after Japan's host spot was reallocated. Pletneva was selected to represent the United States at the 2020 Summer Olympics alongside Isabelle Connor, Camilla Feeley, Lili Mizuno, and Nicole Sladkov. They finished eleventh in the qualification round for the group all-around.

References

External links 
 
 

2002 births
Living people
American rhythmic gymnasts
Pan American Games medalists in gymnastics
Pan American Games silver medalists for the United States
Gymnasts at the 2019 Pan American Games
Medalists at the 2019 Pan American Games
Russian emigrants to the United States
People from Caldwell, New Jersey
Sportspeople from Essex County, New Jersey
Gymnasts from Saint Petersburg
Gymnasts at the 2020 Summer Olympics
Olympic gymnasts of the United States
21st-century American women